Foreigner is a British-American rock band, originally formed in New York City in 1976 by veteran British guitarist and songwriter Mick Jones and fellow Briton and ex-King Crimson member Ian McDonald, along with American vocalist Lou Gramm. Jones came up with the band's name as he, McDonald and Dennis Elliott were British, whereas Gramm, Al Greenwood and Ed Gagliardi were American.

In 1977, Foreigner released its self-titled debut album, the first of four straight albums to be certified at least 5× platinum in the US. Foreigner peaked at No. 4 on the US album chart and in the top 10 in Canada and Australia, while yielding two top 10 hits in North America, "Feels Like the First Time" and "Cold as Ice". Their 1978 follow-up, Double Vision, was even more successful peaking at No. 3 in North America with two hit singles, "Hot Blooded" a No. 3 hit in both countries, and the title track, a US No. 2 and a Canadian No. 7. Foreigner's third album, Head Games (1979), went to No. 5 in North America producing two top 20 singles, including its title track.

Reduced to a quartet, their album 4 (1981) hit No. 1 (for 10 weeks) in the US and No. 2 in Canada, while becoming Foreigner's break-through album outside of North America, going top 5 in the UK, Germany and Australia. Three of 4's singles were hits:  "Urgent" reached No. 1 in Canada and on the new US Rock Tracks chart, rose to No. 4 on the US Hot 100 and became their first top 15 hit in Germany; the ballad "Waiting for a Girl Like You" peaked at No. 2 in both the US (for a record 10 weeks) and Canada, topped the US Rock Tracks chart and became their first top 10 hit in the UK and Australia; and "Juke Box Hero" reached No. 3 on the Rock Tracks chart and the top 30 on the Hot 100. In 1982, Foreigner released its first greatest hits album, Records, which has gone on to sell 7 million copies in the US. In 1984, Foreigner had its biggest hit single, the anthemic ballad "I Want to Know What Love Is", which topped the US, UK, Canadian and Australian charts, while hitting No. 3 in Germany and the top 10 in numerous other countries. Its source album, Agent Provocateur, was the band's most successful in the UK, Germany and some other countries in Europe, where it peaked at No. 1, and in Australia where it peaked at No. 3, while making the top 5 in the US and Canada.

After a break, Foreigner released Inside Information (1987), which despite the No. 6 US and Australian hit, "Say You Will" (which also rose to No. 1 on the US Rock Tracks chart) and the No. 5 US hit, "I Don't Want to Live Without You" (which also reached No. 1 on the US Adult Contemporary chart), had a large sales drop-off, only hitting the top 10 in a few European countries with a No. 15 peak in the US. The band's most recent albums, Unusual Heat (1991), without Gramm, who departed due to the band's shift towards the use of synthesizers, Mr. Moonlight (1994), with Gramm back on vocals, and Can't Slow Down (2009), once again without Gramm, were not major sellers; the highest chart positions were obtained in Germany, where the last album peaked at No. 16. Foreigner is one of the world's best-selling bands of all time with worldwide sales of more than 80 million records, including 37.5 million in the US. Leader Mick Jones has been for many years the only founding member still involved.

Band history

Formation, 1976
Since its beginning, Foreigner has been led by English musician Mick Jones (former member of Nero and the Gladiators, Johnny Hallyday's band, Spooky Tooth and The Leslie West Band). After the collapse of the Leslie West Band in 1976, Jones found himself stranded in New York City; West's manager, Bud Prager, encouraged Jones to continue his songwriting and rehearse a band of his own in some space Prager had near his New York office.

Jones got together with New York keyboardist Al Greenwood (who had just played with former Flash members Colin Carter and Mike Hough in a group called Storm), drummer Stan Williams and Louisiana bassist Jay Davis (later with Rod Stewart) and began jamming. Another friend, Stories singer Ian Lloyd, was brought in to sing but Jones decided the chemistry was not quite right and retained only Greenwood as he renewed his search for players. During a session for Ian Lloyd's album, Jones met up with transplanted Englishman and ex-King Crimson member Ian McDonald and another session for Ian Hunter unearthed another fellow Brit in drummer Dennis Elliott. But after auditioning about forty or fifty singers, they found that the right vocalist was becoming harder to come by until Jones pulled out a Black Sheep album given to him backstage at a 1974 Spooky Tooth concert by that group's lead singer, Lou Gramm. Jones put in a call to Gramm, who was back in his hometown of Rochester, New York, after Black Sheep's break-up, and sent him a plane ticket to New York City. Gramm proved to be the missing piece of the puzzle and Brooklyn bassist Ed Gagliardi completed the new sextet.

A name, "Trigger", was tentatively agreed to and was the name that appeared on their demo tape, but it was passed on by all the record companies it was delivered to. John Kalodner, a former journalist and radio programmer who was working in A&R at Atlantic Records, happened to spot a tape on Atlantic president Jerry L. Greenberg's desk with the Trigger identification on it. Kalodner had just been to hear an outfit called Trigger and realized that this was not the same band. He convinced Greenberg that at least one of the songs on the tape could be a big hit and to look into signing this group immediately. Because the Trigger name was already taken, Jones came up with the Foreigner moniker from the fact that no matter what country they were in, three would be foreigners, because he, McDonald and Elliott were English, while Gramm, Greenwood and Gagliardi were American.

Debut album, March 1977
In November 1976, after six months of rehearsals, the newly named Foreigner started recording their debut album with producers John Sinclair and Gary Lyons at The Hit Factory but switched to Atlantic Recording Studios where they finished recording the basic tracks and completed the overdubs. The first attempt at mixing the album was done at Sarm Studios, London. But, because of the band's dissatisfaction with the results, the album was re-mixed back at Atlantic by Mick Jones, Ian McDonald and Jimmy Douglass. Bud Prager signed on as the group's manager, a role he would continue in for the next 17 years.

The band's debut, Foreigner, was released in March 1977 and was certified for sales of five million copies in the United States, staying in the top 20 for a year with a peak at No. 4.  It also made the top 10 in both Canada and Australia and went to No. 1 in Norway. Foreigner had three significant hits in North America with "Feels Like the First Time" hitting No. 4 in the US and No. 7 in Canada, "Cold as Ice" reaching No. 6 and No. 9 in the countries and "Long, Long Way from Home" peaking at around No. 20.  "Cold as Ice" was also modestly successful in the UK, Australia, the Netherlands and Belgium where it reached the top 20 or 30.

1977–1990 
By May 1977, Foreigner was already headlining theaters and had already scored a gold record for the first album. Not long afterwards, they were selling out U.S. basketball arenas and hockey rinks. After a show at Memorial Hall in Kansas City, Kansas, on May 6, 1977, drummer Elliott injured his hand, prompting the band to call in Ian Wallace (ex-King Crimson) to play alongside Elliott on some of the dates until the hand was healed.

After almost a year on the road, the band played before over two hundred thousand people at California Jam II on March 18, 1978, and during the following month, the band toured Europe, Japan and Australia for the first time.

Their second album, Double Vision (released in June 1978), co-produced by Keith Olsen, topped their previous, selling seven million records in the US, peaking at No. 3 in both the US and Canada, while dropping to No. 13 in Australia.  It was the band's first album to chart in the UK where it peaked at No. 32, but Double Vision (and their next two albums) did not chart in Norway where their debut album had gone No. 1. The album spawned hits that were even more successful in North America than those from their debut album with "Hot Blooded" hitting No. 3 in both countries, the title track "Double Vision" reaching No. 2 in the US and No. 7 in Canada with "Blue Morning, Blue Day" reaching No. 15 and No. 21. Aside from "Hot Blooded" reaching No. 24 in Australia there was little airplay or sales in other countries for the singles from Double Vision or from their next album, Head Games.

Album number three, Head Games (September 1979), co-produced by Roy Thomas Baker, which was referred to by Gramm as their "grainiest" album, was also successful, in this case because of the thunderous "Dirty White Boy" and another title track hit "Head Games".  Both songs were top 15 hits in the US and Canada but did not chart in any other countries.  The album reached No. 5 in North America but its sales dropped off substantially in Australia (No. 45) without any gains in any other countries.

For Head Games, bassist Ed Gagliardi was replaced by Englishman Rick Wills. In his autobiography, Juke Box Hero (named after the seminal Foreigner song), Gramm explains why the band parted ways with Gagliardi: "He was a little headstrong and had his own ideas that weren't always compatible with what we were trying to accomplish. Ed was obstinate at times, playing the song the way he wanted to play it rather than the way it was drawn up. Jones often had to stop sessions to get Ed back on track. After a while it became tiresome and slowed down the recording process." Gramm went on to say that he was disappointed overall with Head Games and thought it sounded unfinished. It ended up selling about two million fewer than its predecessor.

In September 1980, co-founders Al Greenwood and Ian McDonald were sacked.  One reason was that Jones wished to have more control over the band and write most of the music (along with Gramm). In his book, Gramm goes on to talk about this difficult time: "The chemistry that made the band right in the beginning didn't necessarily mean it would always be right. I think a pretty major communication lapse appeared and I don't think anybody really knew what anybody was feeling—the deep, inner belief about the direction of the band and how we were progressing. We had reached a point where there was a lot of dissatisfaction".

In the liner notes for the 2000 release, Juke Box Heroes: The Foreigner Anthology, Jones went on to elaborate further: "Ian McDonald, who I consider a great musician and multi-instrumentalist, began to focus more and more on guitar playing, while I believed his true talent lay more in the dimensional and creative imagery he gave the first two albums. Al Greenwood, our keyboard wiz and a very important part of the Foreigner sound at the beginning, had also started to focus more on songwriting. Although both their contributions to the band had been vital, a conflict was developing about the musical direction of the band. I just felt we needed to clarify it. So Lou, Rick, Dennis and I made the decision, and that's when we went down to four."

And according to McDonald in a 1999 interview, "Mick and Lou decided they wanted to be the focus of the band. Mick wanted to make it more apparent that it was his group, so he decided to make a smaller group. That was his decision. I wouldn't have left—I loved the group, it was not my decision." McDonald noted that there was much creative compromise working in the band and that he did more than he received credit for, much as he did in King Crimson.
McDonald stated that "he had a lot to do with the making of those records and the arrangements and the creating of those songs, more than is probably apparent. I did a lot that went uncredited, which I was happy to do though. When you're in a group you must contribute as much as you can. I was happy to do that. But as I said, it maybe didn't appear that I was doing as much as I in fact was. I had a lot to do with that group... as well as... Mick Jones, obviously, and everyone else—I'm not trying to take all the credit, but I'm just saying that I was there, I was involved, and I loved it."

The band was now stripped down to a quartet, with session players brought in as needed to record or tour (see below for complete list of members). Greenwood soon joined Gagliardi to form the AOR band Spys, with John Blanco, Billy Milne and John DiGaudio. The band released two albums, an eponymous debut, and the follow-up Behind Enemy Lines.

In the meantime, Foreigner began work on the next album at Electric Lady Studios in New York City with producer Robert John "Mutt" Lange, engineered by Dave Wittman (currently with Trans-Siberian Orchestra). 4 (released in July 1981) contained the hits "Urgent" (which includes the famous Junior Walker sax solo), "Waiting for a Girl Like You", "Juke Box Hero" and "Break it Up". Thomas Dolby played synthesizers on 4 (he contributed the signature synth sound on "Urgent" and played the intro to "Waiting for a Girl Like You").  4 became Foreigners first and only No 1. album in the US, spending 10 weeks in that position, and peaked at No. 2 in Canada.  It also became the band's break-through album overseas, reaching the top 5 in the UK, Germany and Australia.

The first single, "Urgent" peaked at No. 4 on the US Hot 100 and topped US Album Rock Tracks chart and the Canadian RPM Singles Chart.  It also became their biggest hit to date in Germany reaching the top 15 there, higher than the other singles from the album, but was less successful in Australia, peaking at No. 24 and the UK, where it did not chart. The second single, "Juke Box Hero" was very successful on rock stations in North America, reaching No. 3 on the US Rock Tracks chart, but only reached No. 26 on the US Hot 100 and No. 39 in Canada, while reaching the top 30 in Germany and France, their first song to chart in the later.  The third single released, the power ballad "Waiting for a Girl Like You", went to No. 2 on the US Hot 100 for a record 10 consecutive weeks and, like "Urgent", topped the US Rock Tracks chart.  It also went to No. 2 in Canada and also became their first single to reach the top 10 in the UK (No. 8) and Australia (No. 3) while reaching the top 20 in the Netherlands and Belgium and the top 30 in Germany and France.

For their 1981–82 tour in support of 4, the group added Peter Reilich (keyboards, synthesizers, who had played with Gary Wright), former Peter Frampton band member Bob Mayo (keyboards, synthesizers, guitar, backing vocals) and Mark Rivera (sax, flute, keyboards, synthesizers, guitar, backing vocals). Mayo and Rivera had also appeared on the sessions for 4. Reilich was dropped in May 1982 but Mayo and Rivera continued with the band through 1988.

Foreigner's next album, Agent Provocateur, co-produced by Alex Sadkin, was released in December 1984 and in 1985 gave them their first and only No. 1 hit song in the US and several other countries (except for Canada were "Urgent" had reached No. 1) when "I Want to Know What Love Is", a ballad backed by Jennifer Holliday and the New Jersey Mass Choir, topped the charts in the US (both Hot 100 and Rock Tracks), UK, Canada, Australia, New Zealand, Norway, Sweden, etc. while hitting No. 3 in Germany (their only top 10 hit there), No. 4 in France (their only top 20 hit there) and No. 6 in both the Netherlands and Belgium. "That Was Yesterday" was the next single from the album in early 1985 and proved to be another sizable hit reaching No. 12 on the US Hot 100 (No. 4 on Rock Tracks) and the top 30 in several other countries.  The album was equally successful becoming Foreigner's only No. 1 album in the UK, Germany and Norway while reaching No. 3 in Australia (its biggest album there) and Canada, and No. 4 in the US and New Zealand (its biggest album there).  It was certified 3× platinum in the US, their lowest selling album to date in that country.

During their 1985 summer/fall tour, Foreigner appeared at the first Farm Aid on September 22 in Champaign, Illinois.

In between his Foreigner commitments, Jones also started a side career as a producer for such albums as Van Halen's 5150 (1986), Bad Company's Fame and Fortune (1986) and Billy Joel's Storm Front (1989).

In December 1987, Foreigner released Inside Information, spawning hits such as "Say You Will" and "I Don't Want to Live Without You".

On May 14, 1988, the band headlined Atlantic Records 40th Anniversary concert at Madison Square Garden, culminating with "I Want to Know What Love Is", in which the likes of Phil Collins, Crosby, Stills and Nash, Roberta Flack and other Atlantic artists joined in, singing in the choir.

Later during the summer, the band went back on the road but the touring for Inside Information was limited to Europe, Japan and Australia. For this tour, Rivera and Mayo were not available, so Larry Oakes (guitar, keyboards, synthesizers, backing vocals) and Lou Cortelezzi (sax) augmented the quartet of Gramm, Jones, Elliott and Wills.

Lead vocalist Gramm's departure, May 1990
In the late 1980s, Jones and Gramm each put out solo efforts on Atlantic. Gramm released Ready or Not in January 1987 and shortly after its release, rehearsals for Foreigner's next album had started but ground to a halt as Gramm's status with the group was uncertain. But after the promotion and concert dates for Gramm's album were finished, cooler heads prevailed and Lou rejoined Foreigner in the studio for Inside Information, which was out at the end of 1987. Jones had Mick Jones in August 1989, then Gramm followed with his second solo release, Long Hard Look (October 1989), and decided to leave the group in May 1990 while preparing to tour behind Long Hard Look as the opener for Steve Miller Band. After finishing this tour, Gramm went on to form the short-lived band Shadow King, which put out one eponymous album on Atlantic in October 1991.

Meanwhile, Jones brought in a new lead singer, Johnny Edwards (formerly of the bands Buster Brown, Montrose, King Kobra, Northrup and Wild Horses). Edwards made his first live appearance with Foreigner at the Long Island club Stephen Talkhouse on August 15, 1990, where he, Jones, Dennis Elliott and Rick Wills appeared, joined by special guests Terry Thomas (on guitar, who produced their next album) and Eddie Mack on harmonica.

The new edition of Foreigner released the album Unusual Heat in June 1991. This was at the time their worst-selling album and only climbed as high as No. 117 on the Billboard 200, although "Lowdown and Dirty" was a minor mainstream rock hit, reaching No. 4 on that chart.

In July 1991 the new lineup of Foreigner played some European dates then made its official U.S. debut on August 9 performing on the second night of a Billy Joel benefit concert at Deep Hollow Ranch in Montauk, New York, to raise funds for the preservation of Montauk Point Lighthouse.

For their 1991 tour, Jeff Jacobs, who had played in Joel's band, was brought in as the new keyboardist and Mark Rivera returned. But during the fall leg of this tour, Elliott decided to leave the group after a concert at The Ritz in NYC on November 14, 1991, and embark on a career as a wood sculptor. Larry Aberman was then recruited as a temporary replacement until Mark Schulman arrived in 1992 as drummer for the next three years. Scott Gilman (guitar, sax, flute) joined the touring band in 1992 and Thom Gimbel took over from Gilman and Rivera in late 1992 after they departed. When Gimbel went to Aerosmith in 1993, Gilman returned to handle the guitar/sax/flute duties until Gimbel came back permanently in the spring of 1995.

Gramm returns, 1992
During the Los Angeles riots, inside the confines of the Sunset Marquis Hotel in West Hollywood, where Mick Jones had gone to meet with Lou Gramm, they both ended up sequestered by a city curfew. They decided to use their time together resurrecting their partnership. "I flew to Los Angeles, during the riots," says Gramm. "We got flown to John Wayne Airport instead of LAX because they were shooting at the planes. Mick and I were holed up in the Sunset Marquis in L.A., with armed security guards walking around on the roof. It was a little weird, to say the least."

Gramm ended up rejoining Foreigner, bringing along his Shadow King bandmate bassist Bruce Turgon to replace bassist Wills (who'd left after the band's 1991 tour after a falling out with Jones) and co-produced the band's second greatest hits album, The Very Best ... and Beyond (September 1992), which included three new songs.

1994–2003

In October 1994, Foreigner released what was supposed to be a comeback album, Mr. Moonlight, in Japan. Featuring new drummer Mark Schulman and augmented by a fifth member, keyboardist Jeff Jacobs, this album was not released in the U.S. until February 1995 and fared even worse than Unusual Heat. It only peaked at No. 136 on the Billboard 200, although the ballad "Until the End of Time" was a minor hit, reaching No. 42 on the Billboard Hot 100.

In January 1995, Ron Wikso (who had played in the Storm with former Journey members Gregg Rolie and Ross Valory) took over percussion duties from Schulman, and Brian Tichy succeeded Wikso in 1998 before Schulman would return in 2000.

In 1997, Gramm underwent surgery to remove a brain tumor. The medications he was prescribed caused considerable weight gain and weakened his singing voice. By 1998, the band was back on the road, but Gramm was visibly struggling and it would take him several years to get back to the point where he felt comfortable on stage.

In the summer of 1999, Foreigner went on tour as the opening act for Journey and the following summer, Jeff Jacobs had to leave the road for a short time during the band's 2000 summer tour while his wife was giving birth to their child. Keyboardist John Purdell (who had been co-producer of the new tracks on their 1992 album The Very Best of ... and Beyond) stepped in to sub for Jacobs until he was able to return. 

In 2001, the Warner Music Group selected Foreigner and 4 to be among the first group of albums from their catalog to be remastered, enhanced and released in the new DVD Audio format.

In 2002, the 25th Anniversary Year brought affirmation of the enduring respect for Foreigner recordings with Rhino Entertainment reissuing the 1977 to 1981 multi-platinum albums in special enhanced formats. Foreigner, Double Vision, Head Games and 4 received the attention of Rhino's staff with new photos, liner notes and bonus tracks of previously unreleased material. New greatest hits albums were also produced in the U.S. and in Europe. The U.S. version reached No. 80 on the Billboard 200 Album chart.

For the group's 25th Anniversary Tour in 2002, they were joined by former Heart and Montrose drummer Denny Carmassi.

In late October/early November, then December, of 2002, Foreigner played in Belgium and Germany at the annual Night of the Proms festival. It was the last time that Lou Gramm and Mick Jones would play together until June 2013. Gramm would leave the group in early 2003. Jones stated that he and Gramm split because they weren't communicating: "I think we really tried hard to save it, but it got to the point when we both realized that to go on would be detrimental for both of us."

New lead vocalist Kelly Hansen, March 2005
Jones, the founder and only remaining original member of Foreigner, decided to take some time off before looking to form a new lineup in 2004. On July 25, 2004, in Santa Barbara, California, at Fess Parker's DoubleTree Resort, Jones appeared at a benefit show for muscular dystrophy dubbed "Mick Jones & Friends" that included: Jeff Jacobs, Thom Gimbel, former Dokken bass player Jeff Pilson, future Black Country Communion drummer Jason Bonham (son of Led Zeppelin drummer John Bonham and leader of Bonham) and Bonham singer Chas West. West was front man for that show only. Inspired by the event and further encouraged by Jason Bonham, Jones continued the search for a new frontman. He would eventually find former Hurricane singer Kelly Hansen, who had sent the band an audition tape and was invited aboard in March 2005, making his debut with the group on March 11 at Boulder Station near Las Vegas. During their 2005 spring tour, Chas West appeared briefly with the band as a special guest, playing rhythm guitar.

Their 2005 BMG album, Extended Versions, featured the new line-up playing all their classic hits live in concert in one of the most "studio like, clean sounding" live album recordings produced.

Can't Slow Down, Jones' health issues, and Acoustique (2007–2012)

Foreigner joined Def Leppard along with Styx on tour in 2007. They also toured extensively in their own right in 2007—the thirtieth anniversary of the release of their debut.

In September 2007, it was announced that Foreigner would join Pete Townshend, Bill Wyman and the Rhythm Kings and Paolo Nutini as openers for the one-night-only Led Zeppelin reunion show in memory of Atlantic Records' Ahmet Ertegun. The show took place on December 10, 2007 in London, England, having been postponed by 2 weeks because Jimmy Page fractured a finger.

In late 2007, keyboardist Jeff Jacobs left Foreigner after 16 years and was replaced, first by Paul Mirkovich then by Michael Bluestein (in 2008). And in 2008, Bonham also parted ways with Foreigner. Bryan Head was then brought in to fill the drum chair. But his tenure was short and he also departed to be replaced by the returning Tichy.

The band released a greatest hits anthology on July 15, 2008, titled No End in Sight: The Very Best of Foreigner. The anthology included all of their greatest hits plus some new live recordings and a new studio track, "Too Late", which was their first new song release since the 1994 album Mr. Moonlight and the first recorded output of the new lineup. "Too Late" was released as a single on June 17, 2008.

Foreigner released a new album on September 29, 2009, titled Can't Slow Down. It was one of several recent classic rock releases (AC/DC, the Eagles, Journey and Kiss being four others) to be released exclusively through the Walmart stores chain in the US, while in Europe the album was released by earMUSIC (a label part of the Edel group), charting top 20 in Germany (16) and top 30 in Switzerland. Can't Slow Down debuted at No. 29 on the Billboard 200. The first two singles from the album, "When It Comes to Love" and "In Pieces" both reached the top 20 on Billboards Adult Contemporary chart.

In 2010, it was awarded a gold certification from the Independent Music Companies Association, which indicated sales of at least 100,000 copies throughout Europe.

In early 2010, Foreigner teamed up with Styx and Kansas for the United in Rock Tour.

On May 4, 2010, it was announced that Brian Tichy's replacement as drummer would be Jason Sutter.

Jason Sutter's time with the band was short as he left by 2011. Mark Schulman then returned to Foreigner for his third go-round as drummer.

On February 20, 2011, the band played for the first time in Bangalore, India along with sitar player Niladri Kumar.

In June 2011, Foreigner (again along with Styx) co-headlined with Journey on their UK tour. After this, they joined up with Journey and Night Ranger on a triple bill summer/fall tour of the US. For some dates of this tour, Brian Tichy filled in for Foreigner's drummer Mark Schulman when he was not available.

From August 19 to September 10, 2011, Night Ranger guitarist Joel Hoekstra did double duty playing for NR as well as subbing for Jones, who had taken ill. Right after this, guitarist Bruce Watson (ex-Rod Stewart) was brought in as Jones' stand-in for the tour's remaining dates and continued to tour with the group when they hit the road again in February 2012 after Jones underwent aortoiliac bypass surgery in Miami.

On October 4, 2011, Foreigner released Acoustique, which presented their best and most famous songs, along with some newer tracks, recorded in stripped-down acoustic mode.

In May 2012, after being diagnosed with colorectal cancer, Bluestein was forced to take a leave of absence from the band. His stand in on keyboards was Ollie Marland. Bluestein was able to return to the group in August 2012 and Tichy once again rejoined in the interim until his schedule with Whitesnake called him away. In September 2012, the man Tichy replaced in Whitesnake, Chris Frazier, became Foreigner's new percussionist.

On August 31, 2012, after over a year away, Jones returned to the concert stage at Atlanta's Chastain Park. Guitarist Watson, in the meantime, stayed on until Jones was able to return to full health. At this very same show, keyboardist Derek Hilland (ex-Iron Butterfly, Whitesnake and Rick Springfield) came on board to sub for Bluestein for the group's late summer/fall tour dates and again during the winter/spring of 2013 until Bluestein was able to return.

2013–present
On January 9, 2013, the band's original drummer, Dennis Elliott, joined Foreigner on stage at the Hard Rock Cafe in Hollywood, Florida, to play on "Hot Blooded". 

In addition to touring small clubs and venues, the band frequently is engaged for private parties and conventions, including playing at SeaWorld in Orlando for an IBM Rational Conference (June 6, 2012), at the Gaylord convention center in Washington, D.C., for the Teradata Partners 2012 conference (October 25, 2012) and at SAP's Field Kickoff Meeting in Las Vegas (January 23, 2013).

On June 13, 2013, at the 44th Annual Songwriters Hall of Fame Award Ceremony, Jones and Gramm were officially inducted to the Songwriters Hall of Fame. Billy Joel was on hand to induct Jones and Gramm, singing snippets of Foreigner's hits in his introduction speech. Jones said he was proud as the honor makes his work "legit". The duo then took stage one more time and, along with Thom Gimbel and the house band, performed "Juke Box Hero" and "I Want to Know What Love Is" with Anthony Morgan's Inspirational Choir of Harlem—a performance that brought the entire audience to its feet.

In 2014, Foreigner teamed up with Styx and former Eagles guitarist Don Felder for the Soundtrack of Summer Tour.

Original bassist Ed Gagliardi died on May 11, 2014, aged 62, after an eight-year battle with cancer. Although discussions of an original member reunion had been proposed, the original band had not performed together since 1979.

On June 18, 2014, Foreigner teamed up with the Brockton High School concert choir at the Leader Bank Pavilion in Boston, MA. They performed one of their greatest hits, "I Want to Know What Love Is".

On January 12, 2015 in Sarasota, Florida, Foreigner were joined on stage by original drummer Dennis Elliott and former bassist Rick Wills to play "Hot Blooded".

In Hartford, Connecticut on June 24, 2015, Foreigner began a summer tour as the opening act for Kid Rock.

Foreigner appeared on the Today Show on February 11, 2016, along with the choir from Our Lady of Mercy Academy to promote their Acoustic Tour and the release of their new album, In Concert: Unplugged.

On September 24, 2016, Foreigner performed before an estimated 20,000+ people at the 100th anniversary of the Durham Fair in Durham, Connecticut. The encore song "I Want to Know What Love Is" utilized the local Coginchaug High School concert choir for backup—their performance having been rehearsed with the band via Skype during the previous months.

In a 2016 interview, Jones talked about a possible 40th-anniversary reunion tour, featuring the Head Games-era lineup: "It's quite possible. We've actually been talking about it. I'm not at a point where I can say it's definitely gonna happen, but we're all working on trying to make it happen. It's kind of exciting. And hopefully it'll be feasible and possible to pull it off next year (2017). Lou (Gramm) and I have communicated and we've kept up a sort of loose communication as I have actually also with Ian McDonald, Al Greenwood, Dennis Elliott and Rick Wills. We're at the early stages, but we're trying to put something together to commemorate (it's scary when I say it) 40 years."

On November 25, 2016 in celebration of their 40th anniversary, Foreigner released a limited-edition 10-inch vinyl EP, The Flame Still Burns, on Rhino Records for Record Store Day's Black Friday event. The EP's track listing contained the title song (which had previously appeared on Foreigner's Acoustique album and had earlier been featured in the 1998 film Still Crazy) plus live "unplugged" versions of "Feels Like the First Time", "Long, Long Way from Home" and "Juke Box Hero". On July 20, 2017, at Jones Beach Theater in New York, the current Foreigner lineup were joined for their encore by Lou Gramm, Ian McDonald and Al Greenwood to help celebrate the band's 40th anniversary and Greenwood and McDonald came back the following year to take the stage with the group for their Jones Beach show on June 22, 2018. Dennis Elliott likewise joined his old mates for two songs at Foreigner's show on August 2, 2017, at MidFlorida Credit Union Amphitheatre in Tampa, Florida.

Another reunion was announced for a pair of shows to take place on October 6–7, 2017, at the Soaring Eagle Casino & Resort in Mount Pleasant, Michigan, where the group was set to be joined again by Lou Gramm, Dennis Elliott, Al Greenwood, Ian McDonald and Rick Wills. The concerts were filmed for future release, appearing on PBS stations in the U.S. on June 8, 2018.

In a July 2018 interview with OC Weekly, bassist Jeff Pilson said that Foreigner had no plans to release a new studio album, but would continue to release singles periodically.

On November 9, 2018, all surviving original members of Foreigner came on stage to play alongside the current line-up for a show at Microsoft Theater in Los Angeles, beginning a series of "Foreigner Then and Now" concerts set to run through the end of the year.

In October 2019, the group was slated once again to be joined by the surviving original players for a handful of shows as the Double Vision: Then and Now tour. However, on October 2, it was announced that Lou Gramm would not be taking part in these dates due to illness.

Also in 2019, a jukebox musical, named Jukebox Hero after Foreigner's hit single, featuring the band's catalog debuted. While being interviewed by Rolling Stone about the musical, Gramm mentioned he and Jones were considering revisiting several songs that the two had written before Gramm's second departure in 2003. 

Foreigner announced a 2020 summer tour with support from Kansas and Europe called "Juke Box Heroes" in reference to the song of the same name.

On May 19, 2020, Foreigner announced the band's Juke Box Heroes 2020 Tour was canceled, due to the COVID-19 pandemic. On March 18, 2021, Pilson announced that Thom Gimbel would be departing from the band. Gimbel was replaced by rhythm guitarist Luis Maldonado. Pilson would later confirm on March 20, 2021 that Foreigner were working on new music: "[But] we are working on some music. So I think that what's gonna happen is whatever other things we release in the next couple of years, there will be some new songs added to it. So that's what I see kind of happening. 'Cause we're working on a few that are not that far away. So I would say expect a package deal to have a couple of new songs on it."

Jones was absent from the band's 2021 tour, leaving no members from the original or classic line-up. Thus, none of the band's line-up for the tour played on the original versions of any songs.
It was falsely reported Jones joined the band at their show in New Brunswick, NJ on October 29, 2021, for "Hot Blooded;" rather, it was former bassist Wills.  Jones was able to join the band on March 9, 2022 at the St. Augustine Amphitheater performance.

Founding member Ian McDonald died from colon cancer at his home in New York City on February 9, 2022, at the age of 75. 

In 2022, they were announced to be opening for Kid Rock on select dates for his Bad Reputation Tour.

On November 14, 2022, the band announced that they would be embarking on their farewell tour, which was set to begin in 2023 and conclude in 2024.

Band members

Current
Mick Jones – lead and rhythm guitars, keyboards, backing and lead vocals 
Jeff Pilson – bass, keyboards, backing vocals 
Kelly Hansen – lead vocals, percussion 
Michael Bluestein – keyboards, backing vocals 
Bruce Watson – rhythm and lead guitars, backing vocals 
Chris Frazier – drums, percussion 
 Luis Maldonado – rhythm guitar, backing vocals

Former
Lou Gramm – lead vocals, percussion 
Dennis Elliott – drums, percussion, occasional backing vocals 
Ian McDonald – rhythm and lead guitars, keyboards, saxophone, flute, backing vocals 
Al Greenwood – keyboards, synthesizers 
Ed Gagliardi – bass, backing vocals 
Rick Wills – bass, backing vocals 
Johnny Edwards – lead vocals, rhythm and lead guitars 
Jeff Jacobs – keyboards, backing vocals 
Thom Gimbel – rhythm guitar, keyboards, backing vocals,  saxophone, flute 
Mark Schulman – drums, backing vocals 
Bruce Turgon – bass, backing vocals 
Ron Wikso – drums 
Brian Tichy – drums 
Denny Carmassi – drums 
Jason Bonham – drums 
Chas West – lead vocals 
Paul Mirkovich – keyboards 
Jason Sutter – drums

Discography

Studio albums
 Foreigner (1977)
 Double Vision (1978)
 Head Games (1979)
 4 (1981)
 Agent Provocateur (1984)
 Inside Information (1987)
 Unusual Heat (1991)
 Mr. Moonlight (1994)
 Can't Slow Down (2009)

See also 
 List of best-selling music artists
 List of number-one hits (United States)
 List of number-one albums (United States)
 List of best-selling albums in the United States
 List of artists who reached number one in the United States
 List of artists who reached number one on the U.S. Mainstream Rock chart

References

External links

 
 
 Lou Gramm's official website

 
1976 establishments in New York (state)
American pop rock music groups
American soft rock music groups
Atlantic Records artists
British hard rock musical groups
British pop rock music groups
British soft rock music groups
American expatriates in England
Hard rock musical groups from New York (state)
Musical groups established in 1976
Musical groups from London
Musical groups from New York City